Mangoli railway station (Balochi: منگولی ریلوے اسٹیشن ) is located in Mangoli village, Jaffarabad district of Balochistan province, Pakistan.

See also
 List of railway stations in Pakistan
 Pakistan Railways

References

Railway stations in Jafarabad District
Railway stations on Rohri–Chaman Railway Line